"Gangstas Don't Live That Long" is a song by American rapper Scarface, remixed by Snoop Dogg on his Mixtape That's My Work Vol. 3, and Producer by Mr. Porter.

Music video 
The music video was released on March 11, 2014 and shows the day Gangstas. The music video has surpassed 17 million views on YouTube (Aug. 2021).

References

External links
 
 Snoopdog TV on YouTube

2014 songs
Snoop Dogg songs
Songs written by Snoop Dogg
Gangsta rap songs